Traian Ionescu (17 July 1923 – 4 October 2006) was a Romanian football goalkeeper and coach.

Club career
Traian Ionescu was born on 17 July 1923 in Văleni, Argeș County, Romania and started to play junior level football at age 13 at TC Târgoviște where he stayed until 1939. Afterwards he went to play for Sporting Club Pitești, Vulturii Textila Lugoj and Sportul Muncitoresc Găvana before arriving at Juventus București where he made his Divizia A debut on 6 April 1947, being used by coach Emerich Vogl in a 4–1 victory against Libertatea Oradea. In 1949 he was transferred by CCA București where he won the 1951 Divizia A, being used by coach Gheorghe Popescu I in 5 games, he also helped the team win three Cupa României but played in only one final in 1949 when coach Francisc Ronnay used him in the 2–1 victory against CSU Cluj. Ionescu went to play for CA Câmpulung Moldovenesc where he made his last Divizia A appearance on 27 November 1952 in a 3–0 home victory against Flacăra Petroșani, having a total of 98 games played in the competition.

International career
Traian Ionescu played five games at international level for Romania, making his debut on 20 June 1948 under coach Iuliu Baratky in a 3–2 home victory against Bulgaria at the 1948 Balkan Cup. His following two games were also at the 1948 Balkan Cup, a 2–1 victory against Czechoslovakia and a 0–0 against Poland. Ionescu's last appearance for the national team took place on 22 May 1949 in a friendly which ended with a 3–2 loss against Czechoslovakia.

Managerial career

Traian Ionescu started working as a youth coach in 1952 at Flacăra Ploiești where he discovered talents like Mircea Dridea, Vasile Sfetcu and Constantin Tabarcea, reaching the 1957 national junior championship final which was lost in front of Universitatea Cluj. He went to coach the senior squad of Dinamo București where he showed his availability of discovering and promoting young players like Ion Pârcălab whom after transferring him from UTA Arad turned into one of the best forwards in Europe, Mircea Lucescu whom he saw playing football on a field covered with gravel, Cornel Dinu whom he noticed while playing for Metalul Târgoviște in the quarter-finals of the 1964–65 Cupa României against Dinamo, 16 year-old Florea Dumitrache whom he saw only 10 minutes playing junior level football at TUG București after which he decided to transfer him, Constantin Frățilă, Ilie Datcu, Gabriel Sandu, Florin Cheran and Alexandru Sătmăreanu, all of them together with other players he coached at Dinamo like Ion Nunweiller, Lică Nunweiller and Gheorghe Ene were important players for Romania's national team in the 1960s and 1970s. In his spells with The Red Dogs, Ionescu helped the team win four Divizia A titles and one Cupa României after a 5–3 victory in the final against rivals Steaua București. He had his first coaching experience outside Romania in Turkey at Fenerbahçe with whom he won the Turkish First Football League 1969–70 and a TSYD Cup together with his former Dinamo players, Ion Nunweiller and Ilie Datcu. Traian Ionescu also worked at Sportul Studențesc București, Olimpia Satu Mare, Jiul Petroșani with whom he reached the 1977–78 Balkans Cup final, SC Bacău, Petrolul Ploiești, Steaua București, Chimia Râmnicu Vâlcea, Olt Scornicești, CSM Reșița, having a total of 287 matches as manager in Divizia A, consisting of 128 victories, 70 draws and 89 losses, also having a second coaching experience outside Romania at Morocco's Olympic team. Ionescu died on 4 October 2006 at age 83 in București.

Honours

Player
CCA București
Divizia A: 1951
Cupa României: 1948–49, 1950, 1951

Manager
Dinamo București
Divizia A: 1961–62, 1962–63, 1963–64, 1970–71
Cupa României: 1963–64
Fenerbahçe
Turkish League: 1969–70
TSYD Cup: 1969–70
Jiul Petroșani
Balkans Cup runner-up: 1977–78

References

External links

1923 births
2006 deaths
People from Argeș County
Romanian footballers
Association football goalkeepers
FC Petrolul Ploiești players
FC Steaua București players
Liga I players
Romania international footballers
Romanian football managers
FC Steaua București managers
FC Steaua București assistant managers
FC Dinamo București managers
FC Sportul Studențesc București managers
FC Olimpia Satu Mare managers
FCM Bacău managers
Fenerbahçe football managers
CSM Reșița managers
FC Petrolul Ploiești managers
CSM Jiul Petroșani managers
Liga I managers
Süper Lig managers
Romanian expatriate football managers
Romanian expatriate sportspeople in Turkey
Romanian expatriate sportspeople in Morocco
Expatriate football managers in Turkey
Expatriate football managers in Morocco